Ranfurly Castle is a ruined 15th century castle, about  south west of Bridge of Weir, Renfrewshire, Scotland, in Ranfurly golf course.
Alternatively the castle may be called Ranfurlie Castle.

History
The castle was built by the Knox family in about 1440, but passed to the Earl of Dundonald, a Cochrane in 1665, and subsequently to the Aitkenheads.

Structure
Ranfurly Castle was a small keep, with a courtyard.  Two storeys of the keep remain, although there were previously at least three storeys, and three cellars of the buildings once in the courtyard.

The walls of the ground floor had arrowslits.  The main entrance was at first floor level. The east wing, which was added about 200 years after initial construction, is the most modern part of the building.  A south wing providing three vaults for cattle and stores on the ground floor and probably three rooms for the family above were also added, although the date is unknown.
The walls are constructed of rough random rubble, although there are quoins of dressed stone. In the east wall there is a doorway, and a slit window with a wide internal splay. It is likely that there were adjustments to the initial building at the time of the additions.

See also
Castles in Great Britain and Ireland
List of castles in Scotland

References

External links
Ranfurly Castle - Video footage and narration

Castles in Renfrewshire
Strathgryffe
Ruins in Renfrewshire
History of Renfrewshire
Scheduled Ancient Monuments in Renfrewshire